This is a list of officially licensed novels (and short story collections) based on established comic book and comic strip characters (i.e., media "tie-in" novels).

DC Comics

Marvel Comics

Other comic book publishers

Newspaper comic strip characters

Miscellaneous

See also
 Spider-Man in literature

References

Novels
Novels based on comics
Comics